Peter Phelps (born 20 September 1960 in Sydney) is an Australian actor, singer and writer. He is notable for his role as Trevor Cole in Baywatch. Phelps is also known for his roles in the internationally successful Australian series Sons and Daughters and Stingers and has appeared in feature films including Blackwater Trail with Judd Nelson. He is the brother of Professor Kerryn Phelps.

Career
Phelps began his acting career in the early 1980s with an ongoing role in the Network Ten teen soap opera The Restless Years produced by the Reg Grundy Organisation. After that series ended he had a starring role in new Grundy soap opera Sons and Daughters. It was Phelps who came up with the "Pat the Rat" moniker in the series.

In 1988 he had a brief role in the mini series The Dirtwater Dynasty. Peter featured as David Eastwick, the first-born son of the main character Richard Eastwick, played by Hugo Weaving (who is less than six months older than Phelps).

From 1989–1990, he was one of the lifeguards (Trevor Cole) in the first season of Baywatch, and had a minor role in the film Point Break. He also had roles in A Country Practice and The Flying Doctors. In 1993, Phelps won an Australian Film Institute Best Actor award for his role in the G.P. episode, "Exposed".

From 1998 until 2004, he starred in Stingers, a role that won him the 2002 Logie Award for Most Popular Actor.

Phelps also played a recurring role as doctor Doug "Spence" Spencer on the medical drama, All Saints starting 4 October 2005.

In 2009, Phelps had a busy year. He appeared in two television dramas — Underbelly: A Tale of Two Cities playing detective inspector Joe Messina; and as Vince Marchello (Station Co-ordinator) in Rescue: Special Ops. Also in 2009, he also had a role as a police officer in the film Stone Bros.

In 2009, he appeared in a new public awareness campaign by the NSW Rural Fire Service about the need to prepare for bushfires. This included television and radio advertisements. The campaign was subsequently adopted by the Tasmania Fire Service.

Television work
 Kevin Ryan, The Restless Years, Network 10 (Australia), 1977
 A Country Practice, Seven Network (Australia), 1981
 John Palmer, Sons and Daughters, Seven Network (Australia), 1981–1983
 Will Ballieu, The Challenge, 1986
 Butterfly Island, ABC/Seven Network (Australia), 1987
 Les Darcy, Willesee's Australians, 1987
 David Eastwick, The Dirtwater Dynasty, 1988
 Appeared in episodes of Rafferty's Rules, 1988
 Trevor Cole, Baywatch: Panic at Malibu Pier (pilot), NBC, 1989
 Trevor Cole, Baywatch, NBC, 1989–1990
 Hack "Kangaroo Kid" Wilkins, "The Exchange," The Young Riders, ABC (U.S.), 1991
 Phil North, Heartbreak High, Network 10/ABC (Australia)
 Dennis Taylor, The Flying Doctors (also known as R.F.D.S.), Nine Network
 Station Officer Nick 'The Boss' Connor, Fire, Seven Network (Australia), 1995
 Alex Willis, Police Rescue, ABC (Australia), 1995
 Abo Henry, Blue Murder, ABC (Australia), 1995
 Jimmy Formica, Water Rats, Nine Network (Australia), 1998 
 Peter Church (Mike Fischer), Stingers, Nine Network (Australia), 1998-2004
 Himself, Inside the Arena, 2000
 Detective Inspector Joe Messina, Underbelly: A Tale of Two Cities, 2009
 Station Coordinator Vince Marchello, Rescue: Special Ops, 2009
 Himself in guest appearance, The Joy of Sets, Nine Network, 2011
 Alan Henderson, Home and Away, Seven Network (Australia), 2012
 Paul Craven, Mr & Mrs Murder, Ten Network (Australia), 2013
 Warwick Wilcox, Wonderland, 2013
 Mal Dwyer, Old School, ABC (Australia), 2014
 Gary Morrow, Home and Away, Seven Network (Australia), 2022

Film
 Theo, Undercover, 1983
 Judah/Robert, Playing Beatie Bow, South Australian Film Corporation, 1986
 Eddie, Rock 'N' Roll Cowboys, 1987
 Dave Mitchell, The Lighthorsemen, 1987, Cinecom Pictures, 1988
 Patrick, Starlight Hotel, 1987, Republic, 1988
 Ross Cameron, Breaking Loose, Avalon Films, 1988
 Peter, Maya, Trio Film, 1989
 Australian surfer, Point Break, Twentieth Century-Fox, 1991
 John Pope, Merlin (also known as Merlin: The True Story of Magic), Hemdale Film Corporation, 1992
 Brian Petrie, The Feds: Betrayal, Nine Network (Australia), 1993
 Dozer Brennan, Rough Diamonds, Nine Network/Beyond Films/Film Australia/Film Queensland/Forest Home Films/Southern Star Entertainment, 1994
 Dr. Frank Jamison, Blackwater Trail, Warnervision Entertainment, 1996
 Leo Megaw, Zone 39, Phaedra Cinema, 1996
 Mick Webb, One Way Ticket, 1997
 Presenter, Fire and Ice—The Many Moods of Thredbo and the Snowys (documentary), 1999
 Patrick Phelan, Lantana, Palace Films, 2001
 Rod, Teesh and Trude, 2002
 Constable Lonigan, Ned Kelly, 2003
 Jake, The Square, 2008
 Mark, Stone Bros., 2009
 Skipper Joe, Caught Inside, 2010
Australian Movie: Locusts 2019 - plays the local police officer of a outback town.

Awards and nominations

Stage appearances
Productions of:
 The Club
 Miranda by  Stephen Sewell
 Nicholas Nickleby
 The Sum of Us
 Rwelve Angry Men

Writings
 Books:
Sex without Madonna: The True Confessions of a Hired Gun in Tinseltown (autobiography), Pan Macmillan Publishers Australia, 1994
The Bulldog Track: A grandson's story of an ordinary man's war and survival on the other Kokoda trail, Hachette Australia, 2018
 Contributor to magazines: including Harper's Bazaar.

References

External links

 
Peter Phelps at the National Film and Sound Archive

1960 births
Living people
AACTA Award winners
Australian Anglicans
Australian male film actors
Australian male soap opera actors
Australian people of English descent
Australian people of Scottish descent
Australian people of Swedish descent
Logie Award winners
Musicians from Sydney
Male actors from Sydney